The 1987–88 FA Cup was the 107th season of the world's oldest knockout football competition, The Football Association Challenge Cup, or FA Cup for short. The competition was won by Wimbledon F.C.'s Crazy Gang who defeated league champions Liverpool through a headed goal by Lawrie Sanchez, thus denying Liverpool the double. They would be one of three clubs other than Manchester United, Arsenal, Chelsea and Liverpool to win the trophy in the following 20 years (the others being Everton and Tottenham Hotspur) before Portsmouth's victory in the 2008 final. This was Wimbledon's only FA Cup title during its lifetime.

The tournament started in August 1987 with non-league teams competing in a qualifying competition.

First round proper

Teams from the Football League Third and Fourth Division entered in this round plus Kidderminster Harriers, Burton Albion, Altrincham and Telford United, were given byes. The first round of games were played over the weekend 14–15 November 1987, with the exception of the Welling United – Carshalton Athletic game. Replays were played in the midweek fixtures on 16th-17th. All other replays were played on 28 November.

Second round proper

The second round of games were played over 5–6 December 1987, with replays being played at various dates afterwards (no replay was played on the same night as another).

Third round proper

Teams from the Football League First and Second Division entered in this round. The third round of games in the FA Cup were played over the weekend 9–11 January 1988, with the first set of replays being played on 12–13 January. Three games went to second replays and one of these to a third replay.

Fourth round proper

The fourth round of games were played over the weekend 30 January – 1 February 1988, with replays being played on 3 February. A second replay was then played on 9 February. Holders Coventry City were eliminated by Watford.

Fifth round proper

The fifth set of games were played over the weekend 20–21 February 1988, with replays on 23–24 February.

Sixth round proper

The sixth round of FA Cup games were played over the weekend 12–13 March 1988. There were no replays.

Semi-finals

Luton Town's fine season in the cup competitions culminated in a semi-final clash with Wimbledon at White Hart Lane. Wimbledon emerged as 2-1 winners to reach the FA Cup final, in only their second season in the First Division and their 11th in the Football League.

On the same day, First Division leaders Liverpool took on a resurgent Nottingham Forest at Hillsborough. Top scorer John Aldridge found the net twice in a 2-1 win.

Referee:- Keith Hackett (Sheffield)

Referee:- George Courtney (Spennymoor)

Final

Television Coverage
The right to show FA Cup games were, as with Football League matches, shared between the BBC and ITV. The stations would alternate between showing a live game and a highlights programme. No games from Rounds 1 or 2 were shown. Occasional highlights of replays would be shown on either the BBC or ITV.

These matches were.

1Footage available on YouTube

References

External links
The FA Cup at TheFA.com
FA Cup at BBC.co.uk
FA Cup news at Reuters.co.uk

 
FA Cup seasons
Fa Cup, 1987-88
1987–88 domestic association football cups